Neniatlanta is a genus of small, air-breathing land snails, terrestrial pulmonate gastropod mollusks in the subfamily Laminiferinae of the family Clausiliidae, the door snails, all of which have a clausilium, a sort of sliding door.

Species
Species within the genus Neniatlanta include:
 Neniatlanta pauli  (Mabille, 1865)

References

 Nordsieck, H. (2007). Worldwide Door Snails (Clausiliidae), Recent and Fossil. ConchBooks, Hackenheim, 214 pp.
 Bank, R. A. (2017). Classification of the Recent terrestrial Gastropoda of the World. Last update: July 16th, 2017

Clausiliidae